New Haven State Street station is a commuter rail station located on State Street in downtown New Haven, Connecticut. It is served by Shore Line East and Hartford Line commuter trains, Amtrak  trains, -terminating  trains, and  trains, and a limited number of Metro-North Railroad New Haven Line trains. Originally proposed in 1996, State Street opened on June 7, 2002. A second platform opened on June 8, 2018, in time for the beginning of Hartford Line service.

Service
A station closer to New Haven's business district than Union Station was first proposed in 1996. The station opened on June 7, 2002, for Shore Line East service, with Metro-North service added on June 24, 2002. Hartford Line and New Haven–Springfield Shuttle service began on June 16, 2018. Most Shore Line East and all Hartford Line trains (both Amtrak and CTrail) stop at the station. Travel time to Union Station is approximately two minutes and is fare-free, except on Metro-North. Metro-North trains only serve the station on weekday reverse peak runs (plus one midday trip). There are five trains from Grand Central Terminal and six trains to Grand Central per weekday.

Station design

The Northeast Corridor has four tracks at this location, in a shallow cut. From southeast to northwest, the tracks are numbered 1, 2, 4 and 6. State Street has a three-car-long high-level island platform between tracks 4 and 6, and a  four car-long side platform serving track 1. Track 2 is used only by trains bypassing the station. The station originally only had the island platform when it opened; the side platform was built for the 2018 opening of the Hartford Line. Because the side platform was not part of the original station, the two platforms are not directly connected and are accessed separately, with two pedestrian bridges, staircases and elevators connecting the platforms to the street-level entrance and busway.

Construction on the second platform began in July 2016, using $10 million in federal funding from a Transportation Investment Generating Economic Recovery grant. The second platform was originally expected to be complete by the end of 2017. The construction of the second platform was paired with security improvements, LED walkway and platform lighting, a sheltered bicycle parking area, platform snow melters, and real-time train information displays. The platform opened on June 8, 2018.

References

External links

Hartford Line – New Haven State Street
Shore Line East – State Street Station

State Street entrance from Google Maps Street View

Metro-North Railroad stations in Connecticut
Shore Line East stations
Stations on the New Haven–Springfield Line
State Street station
Railroad stations in New Haven County, Connecticut
State Street station
Stations along New York, New Haven and Hartford Railroad lines
Railway stations in the United States opened in 2002
2002 establishments in Connecticut
Amtrak stations in Connecticut